West Yarmouth is a census-designated place (CDP) in the town of Yarmouth in Barnstable County, Massachusetts, United States. The population was 6,012 at the 2010 census.

Geography 
West Yarmouth is located in the southwest quarter of the town of Yarmouth at  (41.649547, -70.246385). It is bordered to the east by South Yarmouth, to the west by Hyannis in the town of Barnstable, and to the south by Nantucket Sound. To the north is U.S. Route 6, the Mid-Cape Highway, beyond which is the CDP of Yarmouth Port.

Demographics 

As of the census of 2000, there were 6,460 people, 2,911 households, and 1,679 families residing in the CDP. The population density was 371.7/km (963.3/mi). There were 4,929 housing units at an average density of 283.6/km (735.0/mi). The racial makeup of the CDP was 93.10% White, 2.03% African American, 0.48% Native American, 0.53% Asian, 0.02% Pacific Islander, 1.47% from other races, and 2.38% from two or more races. 1.67% of the population were Hispanic or Latino of any race.

There were 2,911 households, out of which 20.5% had children under the age of 18 living with them, 42.6% were married couples living together, 11.9% had a female householder with no husband present, and 42.3% were non-families. 34.5% of all households were made up of individuals, and 16.5% had someone living alone who was 65 years of age or older. The average household size was 2.14 and the average family size was 2.73.

In the CDP, the population was spread out, with 17.7% under the age of 18, 6.0% from 18 to 24, 27.1% from 25 to 44, 25.3% from 45 to 64, and 23.9% who were 65 years of age or older. The median age was 44 years. For every 100 females, there were 87.9 males. For every 100 females age 18 and over, there were 83.6 males.

The median income for a household in the CDP was $35,597, and the median income for a family was $45,686. Males had a median income of $35,461 versus $26,188 for females. The per capita income for the CDP was $19,633. About 7.3% of families and 11.4% of the population were below the poverty line, including 16.9% of those under the age of 18 and 6.5% of those 65 and older.

References

External links
 West Yarmouth Library

Census-designated places in Barnstable County, Massachusetts
Census-designated places in Massachusetts
Populated coastal places in Massachusetts
Yarmouth, Massachusetts